What (typed as  in the  prompt) was a small information utility available in the Incompatible Timesharing System. It could provide information about incoming email, bus schedule on the MIT campus, executable source files or answer the user in a humorous manner.

Implementation
 was written in the MIDAS assembly language. It can still be used on some of the ITS instances maintained across the web. The last traceable edit of the source code was by Ken L. Harrenstien on 16 May 1988.

Usage examples
Without arguments  would print information about inbox status:
*:what
You don't seem to have any recent messages.

:KILL  E$J
*
With the argument bus it would print out information about the next few buses leaving from the MIT campus:
*:what bus
It is now 12:50
Bus 83 leaves Central Sq 13:10, 13:30, 13:45, 14:00, ...
Bus 83 leaves Ringworld/Alewife 13:00, 13:20, 13:40, 13:55, ...
:KILL  E$J
*
Asked about source for NAME,  responded with paths to source files corresponding to NAME:
*:what source for what
UP:SYSENG;
  0   WHAT   201      3 +487    11/30/1987 17:33:23 (5/2/2015) KLH
  0   WHAT   204      3 +493    5/16/1988 19:13:03 (5/4/2015) KLH

*
Not knowing the answer, it would often resort to humor:
*:what is life
You tell me.

:KILL  E$J
*
Finally,  displayed some amount of introspection:
*:what is this
It's an all purpose utility program, dummy!

:KILL  E$J
*:what are you
I am an omniscient utility program, idiot!

:KILL  E$J
*

See also
 Incompatible Timesharing System
 Dynamic debugging technique
 Maclisp

External links
 ITS System Documentation
 UP: Public ITS system operated by the Update Computer Club at Uppsala University
 Website for ITS system hobbyists with much information and documentation

Massachusetts Institute of Technology
Time-sharing operating systems
Utility software